The Flagstaff Unified School District (FUSD) is the primary school district for Flagstaff, Arizona area and neighboring areas.  The district has approximately 11,500 students and operates 16 schools; including three high schools (9–12), two middle schools (6–8), four magnet schools (various grades), ten elementary schools, and two alternative programs.

List of schools

High schools
 Coconino High School
 Flagstaff High School
 Summit High School

Middle schools
 Mount Elden Middle School
 Sinagua Middle School

Alternative schools
 Teenage Parent Program (TAPP)

Magnet schools
 Advanced Placement Academy at Flagstaff High School
 Honors Pre-AP Academy at Mount Elden Middle School
 Alpine Academy at Mount Elden Middle School
 Coconino Institute of Technology (located inside of Coconino High School)
 The Middle School Institute of Technology and Engineering, or MIT-e (located inside of Sinagua Middle School)
 Marshall Elementary Arts and Science Magnet
 Puente de Hozho Bilingual Elementary
 Northern Arizona Distance Learning (on-line)

Elementary schools
 Cromer
 DeMiguel
 Killip
 Kinsey
 Knoles
 Leupp
It is a K-5 elementary school.  all of the students are Native American. In addition to Leupp its attendance zone includes Birdsprings and Tolani Lake. The sole FUSD school in the Navajo reservation, it was previously a K-8 school. According to Mitch Strohmann, the public relations official at FUSD, the school had "made some amazing strides in recent years." Construction on the current campus was scheduled to start in summer 2002. Within the campus, which had a cost of $2.8 million, is a hogan that was dedicated in January 2002. FUSD consulted with the school community on the design of the school.
 Marshall
 Before the Kinlani Dormitory (now the Flagstaff Bordertown Dormitory), a Bureau of Indian Affairs (BIE)-contracting dormitory, stopped taking younger students, it sent younger children living there to Marshall Elementary.
 Puente de Hozho
 Sechrist
 Thomas

Closed schools
 Sinagua High School (2010)
 Flagstaff Middle School (2010)
 Christensen Elementary School (2010)
 South Beaver Elementary School (2010)

References

External links
 Flagstaff Unified School District Web site
 Flagstaff Unified School District Web site (Archive)

School districts in Coconino County, Arizona
Flagstaff, Arizona